Dangerous Game is a 1937 German comedy film directed by Erich Engel and starring Jenny Jugo, Harry Liedtke and Karl Martell.

The film's sets were designed by the art director Karl Haacker and Hermann Warm.

Cast

References

Bibliography

External links 
 

1937 films
1937 comedy films
German comedy films
Films of Nazi Germany
1930s German-language films
Films directed by Erich Engel
German black-and-white films
1930s German films